Severin Anton Averdonk, real name Anton Clemens Averdonk, (1768 – 1817) was a German Roman Catholic clergyman and poet who represented the ideals of the Age of Enlightenment and the French Revolution. He wrote the texts for at least one cantata that Ludwig van Beethoven composed.

Life 
Averdonk was a brother of the court singer Johanna Helene Averdonk. He completed five high school classes in Bonn and received numerous awards. He then attended two philosophical courses at university and began studying theology in 1789.

Averdonk was supported by Eulogius Schneider. In 1790 the latter suggested the  should commission a cantata on the deceased emperor Joseph II in order to make the funeral ceremonies worthy. It bore the title Ode auf den Tod Josephs und Elisens.

Beethoven, who was moved by the theme of the Enlightenment, then composed the Cantata on the Death of Emperor Joseph II.

Averdonk was displeased by the Elector-Archbishop Max Franz, who in 1791 called him a monk qualifying for pastoral care, but who had become a "Minnesinger". Averdonk was also among the poets who wrote contributions in 1813 to celebrate the 25th anniversary of the reading society.

After the French Revolution, whose ideals he shared, Averdonk emigrated to Alsace and was priest in Uffholtz and president of the Société des Amis de la Liberté et de l'Égalité there. He wrote contributions for Eulogius Schneider's Jacobin magazine Argos.

The quality of Averdonk's sealing works were not appreciated by many later on. Words such as "epigonal poetry" were mentioned, and there was also talk of a meanwhile comical horror metaphor in the cantata about the death of the emperor.

References 

18th-century German writers
18th-century German male writers
18th-century German Roman Catholic priests
19th-century German Roman Catholic priests
1768 births
1817 deaths
Place of birth missing